Tengdik is a village in Naryn Region of Kyrgyzstan. It is part of the Kochkor District and the Kochkor rural community (ayyl aymagy). Its population was 5,052 in 2021.

Population

References

Populated places in Naryn Region